Augusto César dos Santos Moreira (born 6 August 1992 in Porto Alegre), known as Augusto César or just Augusto, is a Brazilian footballer who plays for Matsumoto Yamaga FC.

Club career

Tractor
In the summer of 2015 Augusto César joined Persian Gulf Pro League club Tractor on a one–year loan from Brazilian club Internacional. He scored his first goal for Tractor on 16 October 2015 in a 2–1 victory over Foolad.

Honours
Internacional
Campeonato Gaúcho: 2011, 2012, 2013, 2014
Recopa Sudamericana: 2011

Chapecoense
Runner-up:
Série B: 2013
Runner-up:
Campeonato Catarinense: 2013

Recife
Campeonato Pernambucano: 2014

Joinville
Campeonato Catarinense: 2015

References

External links
 

1992 births
Living people
Brazilian footballers
Brazilian expatriate footballers
Brazil youth international footballers
Association football midfielders
Sport Club Internacional players
Sport Club do Recife players
Emirates Club players
Joinville Esporte Clube players
Sanat Naft Abadan F.C. players
Querétaro F.C. footballers
Associação Chapecoense de Futebol players
Matsumoto Yamaga FC players
Campeonato Brasileiro Série A players
Campeonato Brasileiro Série B players
UAE Pro League players
J2 League players
Persian Gulf Pro League players
Brazilian expatriate sportspeople in Mexico
Brazilian expatriate sportspeople in Iran
Brazilian expatriate sportspeople in the United Arab Emirates
Brazilian expatriate sportspeople in Japan
Expatriate footballers in Mexico
Expatriate footballers in Iran
Expatriate footballers in the United Arab Emirates
Expatriate footballers in Japan
Footballers from Porto Alegre